Lieutenant General Sir Andrew John Noble Graham, 5th Baronet,  (born 21 October 1956) is the Colonel of the Royal Regiment of Scotland and was Director General of the Defence Academy of the United Kingdom.

Early life and education
Graham is the son of Sir John Graham, 4th Baronet: he succeeded as 5th Baronet on his father's death on 11 December 2019.  He was educated at Eton College and Trinity College, Cambridge.

Military career
Graham was commissioned into the Argyll and Sutherland Highlanders (Princess Louise's) in 1975. He was appointed a Member of the Order of the British Empire in the 1993 New Year Honours, became Commanding Officer of his regiment in 1995 and commander of the 3rd Infantry Brigade in 1999. He served in Northern Ireland in 2001, for which he was advanced to Commander of the Order of the British Empire, and was appointed Director Army Resources and Plans. He went on to be Deputy Commanding General Multi-National Corps – Iraq in early 2004 and Director General Army Training & Recruiting Agency later in 2004. He became the Royal Regiment of Scotland's first Colonel from 31 March 2007, as well as Director General of the Defence Academy of the United Kingdom from 2008. He was appointed a Companion of the Order of the Bath in the 2011 Birthday Honours.

Later life
Graham unsuccessfully stood for the Conservative Party in the 2016 England and Wales police and crime commissioner elections in Dorset.

References

|-

1956 births
Living people
People educated at Eton College
Alumni of Trinity College, Cambridge
Argyll and Sutherland Highlanders officers
Baronets in the Baronetage of the United Kingdom
British Army lieutenant generals
Companions of the Order of the Bath
Commanders of the Order of the British Empire
Officers of the Legion of Merit
Conservative Party (UK) politicians